Hong Kong is scheduled to compete at the 2017 World Aquatics Championships in Budapest, Hungary from 14 July to 30 July.

Open water swimming

Hong Kong has entered four open water swimmers

Swimming

Hong Kong swimmers have achieved qualifying standards in the following events (up to a maximum of 2 swimmers in each event at the A-standard entry time, and 1 at the B-standard):

Men

Women

Synchronized swimming

Hong Kong's synchronized swimming team consisted of 2 athletes (2 female).

Women

References

Nations at the 2017 World Aquatics Championships
Hong Kong at the World Aquatics Championships
2017 in Hong Kong sport